The Dextrobeam is a highly interactive console that enables collaborative examination of three-dimensional (3-D) medical imaging data for planning, discussing, or teaching neurosurgical approaches and strategies. The console is designed to work in combination with a 3D stereoscopic display. The console enables two-handed interaction by means of two 6 Degree-of-Freedom motion tracking devices. A set of built-in software tools gives users the ability to manipulate and interact with patients’ imaging data in a natural and intuitive way.

The stereoscopic display (a large monitor or a projector) displays volumetric 3D medical structures from patients’ multimodality images allowing groups, large and small, to gain a deeper understanding of complex anatomical relationships.

The Dextrobeam was used as a teaching tool at the following congresses and courses:

The Dextrobeam was installed at the following institutions:

The Dextrobeam was developed and commercialized by Volume Interactions Pte Ltd. It received USA FDA 510(K) - class II (2002) clearance, CE Marking - class I (2002), China SFDA Registration - class II (2004) and Taiwan Registration - type P (Radiology) (2007).

References 

Medical imaging